The Red River National Wildlife Refuge (established 2001) is a preservation project which will ultimately consist of approximately  of United States federal lands and water along that section of the Red River between Colfax in Grant Parish, Louisiana, and the Arkansas state line, a distance of approximately .

The four focus areas for land purchase are:
 Lower Cane River (Natchitoches Parish)
 Spanish Lake Lowlands (Natchitoches Parish)
 Bayou Pierre Floodplain (DeSoto and Red River parishes)
 Wardview (Caddo and Bossier parishes)

See also
 List of National Wildlife Refuges: Louisiana

References

External links
 Red River National Wildlife Refuge - US Fish & Wildlife Service
 
 http://www.facebook.com/RedRiverNWR

Protected areas of Bossier Parish, Louisiana
Protected areas of Caddo Parish, Louisiana
Protected areas of DeSoto Parish, Louisiana
Protected areas of Natchitoches Parish, Louisiana
National Wildlife Refuges in Louisiana
Protected areas of Red River Parish, Louisiana
Protected areas established in 2001